Ginkgo Creek is a stream in the U.S. state of Oregon. It is a tributary to Mill Creek.

Ginkgo Creek was named for the ginkgo trees lining its banks.

References

Rivers of Oregon
Rivers of Jackson County, Oregon